Kroda is a Ukrainian pagan metal band formed in 2003 in Dnipro. The band's primary lyrical themes are heathenism, history, nature, traditionalism and anti-Christianity. Their sixth full-length album was released on May 1, 2015. The band has been labeled as a National Socialist black metal band due to the Holocaust denial expressed in its lyrics and its connections to neo-Nazism.

History 
The band was formed by two musicians, Eisenslav and Viterzgir, in March 2003. The name of the band was taken from the Old East Slavic language and means "The fire of burial bonfire". According to legend, when the bodies of the warriors burned, their souls were carried away with the smoke to the Heavenly Palaces of the Gods. The smoke was a kind of a guide to the Rod.

In May 2004, Kroda released their debut full-length album Поплач мені, річко... (Cry To Me, River...) on Stellar Winter Records.

Their second album До небокраю життя... (Towards The Firmaments Verge Of Life...) was recorded from January to April 2005, and was released on 20 July the same year. In 2012 it was remastered and reissued on Purity Through Fire Records in Germany.

In August 2007, Kroda made their first live performance at the Ukrainian metal music festival "Svarohovo Kolo II", which was held in Sevastopol. On December 22, the band participates in the "Kolovorot Fest" in Kharkiv.

Members 
Current line-up
 Eisenslav – vocals, bass (2003–present)
 One of Thorns – bass (2014–present)
 Rungvar – drums (2014–present)
 Clin – keyboards (2014–present)
 Olgerd – keyboards (2011–present)

Past members
 Viterzgir – guitars, bass, folk instruments, keyboards (2003–2010)
 Khladogard – guitars (2014–2015)

Live musicians
 Beralb – bass (2007–2014)
 AlgizTyr – drums (2007–2008)
 Yurii Krupiak – guitars (2007)
 Serejen – guitars (electric and acoustic) (2007–2010)
 Jotunhammer – sopilka (2007)
 Tur – drums (2008–2010)
 Olgerd – keyboards (2008–2010)

Discography 
Studio albums
 Поплач мені, річко... (2004)
 До небокраю життя... (2005)
 Похорон сонця (Fimbulvinter) (2007)
 Fünf Jahre Kulturkampf (2009)
 Schwarzpfad (2011)
 GinnungaGap GinnungaGaldr GinnungaKaos (2015)
 Навій Схрон (Navij Skhron) (2015)
 Selbstwelt (2018)

References

External links 
 

Ukrainian black metal musical groups
Musical groups established in 2003
National Socialist black metal musical groups